Odontopacha is a genus of moths in the family Lasiocampidae. The genus was erected by Per Olof Christopher Aurivillius in 1909.

Species 
Odontopacha fenestrata Aurivillius, 1909 (Somalia/Tanzania)
Odontopacha kilwana Strand, 1911 (Eritrea/Zimbabwe)
Odontopacha phaula Tams 1929 (Cameroon)
Odontopacha spissa Tams 1929 (Angola/Cameroon)

References
Sources

Citations

Lasiocampidae